Tharu is a Sri Lankan radio station that streams Sinhala and Hindi music. The meaning of the word tharu is "star" in Sinhalese.

Tharu International Service is a live international radio station incorporated with Internet streaming (in radio broadcasting) all around the world. It can be listened to using Windows Media Player or Winamp or through websites that embed the Tharu Player.

There is a list of around 5,000 songs displayed on the parent website and any listener can add songs directly to the playlist. The song playlist in the Tharu studio is automatically uploaded to the parent website, and currently-playing song information (such as artist, composer, director and comments) can be seen in the parent website or media player.

Because of this embedding concept, Tharu e Radio has reached 20,000 listeners per day. Tharu listeners originate 26% from the Middle East, 25% from Sri Lanka, 16% from Korea, 15% from Italy, 8% from the US and 4% from the UK.

Tharu e Radio delivers high audio quality with a higher codec flash audio system and studio-quality dynamic range.

References

External links
 

Internet radio stations
Sinhala-language radio stations in Sri Lanka